Tired Eyes may refer to:

eye fatigue
Tired Eyes (short film), 2002 British documentary about sight impairment
"Tired Eyes", song by Chicken Shack from Accept
"Tired Eyes", song by Neil Young from Tonight's the Night